Louis Frederick Gieg (February 7, 1890 – December 28, 1977) was an American football and basketball player and coach. He served as the head football coach at Swarthmore College from 1913 to 1914, compiling a record of 4–9–2.

Raised in Millville, New Jersey, Geig attended the Pennington Seminary (now The Pennington School), dropping out in order to play basketball professionally.

Head coaching record

References

1890 births
1977 deaths
American football tackles
American men's basketball players
Basketball players from New Jersey
The Pennington School alumni
People from Millville, New Jersey
Players of American football from New Jersey
Sportspeople from Cumberland County, New Jersey
Swarthmore Garnet Tide football coaches
Swarthmore Garnet Tide football players
Swarthmore Garnet Tide men's basketball players